Colton Dale Cowser (born March 20, 2000) is an American professional baseball outfielder in the Baltimore Orioles organization. He played college baseball for the Sam Houston State Bearkats.

Amateur career
Cowser attended Cypress Ranch High School in Cypress, Texas. In 2018, his senior year, he earned all-state honors after batting .411 with 38 RBIs and thirty stolen bases. He was not selected in the 2018 Major League Baseball draft, and enrolled at Sam Houston State University to play college baseball.

In 2019, Cowser's freshman season at Sam Houston State, he was immediately placed into the starting lineup, and hit .361 with seven home runs, 54 RBIs, and nine stolen bases over 56 games. He was awarded the Southland Conference Hitter of the Year. He was also named a Freshman All-American by multiple media outlets including Baseball America, Collegiate Baseball Newspaper, Perfect Game, and D1Baseball.com. Following the season, he earned a spot on the Team USA Collegiate National Team. He was named Most Valuable Player of the 2019 USA vs Cuba Friendship Series after batting .438 with six runs. Prior to the 2020 season, Cowser was named to the Golden Spikes Award watch list alongside earning pre-season Southland Conference honors. Over 14 games for the 2020 season before the remainder of games were cancelled due to the COVID-19 pandemic, Cowser hit .255 with one home run. As a junior in 2021, he slashed .374/.490/.680 with 16 home runs and 52 RBIs over 55 games. He was named the Southland Conference Player of the Year as well as being named to the All-Defensive Team.

Professional career
Cowser was selected by the Baltimore Orioles in the first round with the fifth overall selection of the 2021 Major League Baseball draft. Cowser signed with the Orioles for a $4.9 million bonus.

On August 2, 2021, Cowser made his professional debut with the Rookie-level Florida Complex League Orioles, hitting a solo home run in his second at-bat. After batting .500 over 22 at-bats, he was promoted to the Delmarva Shorebirds of the Low-A East. Over 25 games with Delmarva, Cowser batted .347 with one home run and 26 RBIs. He was assigned to the Aberdeen IronBirds of the High-A South Atlantic League to begin the 2022 season. In late June, he was promoted to the Bowie Baysox of the Double-A Eastern League. In late August, he was promoted to the Norfolk Tides of the Triple-A International League. Over 138 games between the three teams, he slashed .278/.406/.469 with 19 home runs, 66 RBIs, 18 stolen bases, and 36 doubles.

References

External links

Sam Houston State Bearkats bio

2000 births
Living people
Baseball players from Houston
Baseball outfielders
Sam Houston Bearkats baseball players
United States national baseball team players
Florida Complex League Orioles players
Delmarva Shorebirds players
Aberdeen IronBirds players
Bowie Baysox players